IGA, Inc., is an American chain of grocery stores that operates in more than 41 countries. Unlike the chain store business model, IGA operates as a franchise through stores that are owned separately from the brand. Many of these stores operate in small-town markets and belong to families that manage them. It was founded in the United States as the Independent Grocers Alliance in 1926. The headquarters is in Chicago, Illinois.

United States
IGA was started in May 1926 when a group of 100 independent retailers in Poughkeepsie, New York; and Sharon, Connecticut; led by J. Frank Grimes, organized themselves into a single marketing system. Guidance from the IGA management came in the form of marketing and access to a consistent supply chain. After a few years, the company began making its own canned food brand.

By the end of its first year, the group had expanded to include more than 150 retailers. In 1930, over 8,000 grocery stores were using the IGA name. It now operates with 5000 different locations worldwide.

As of 2023, there are 763 locations in 38 states and territories in the US. The states with the highest concentration are North Carolina, South Carolina and Kentucky(

William Olsen was the company CEO until 1988, when he was replaced by Thomas Haggai. Haggai retired in 2016.

The company uses the "Hometown Proud Supermarkets" slogan. Today, many IGA grocery stores are still located in smaller cities and towns throughout the United States.

The stores in the alliance remain independently owned and operated. The alliance oversees several resources shared among the member stores. These include, most visibly, the IGA store brand products and the logistical network that distributes them. The alliance also provides training and assessment programs and an online advertising platform. It regularly coordinates promotional events and charity fundraising events that benefit store communities.

Canada

In Canada (apart from British Columbia), IGA is a group of independent grocers supplied by Sobeys, which franchises the name. Acquired by Sobeys as part of its purchase of the Oshawa Group Ltd., it now operates primarily in Quebec. 

The IGA operations in Atlantic Canada were sold to Loblaw Companies Limited (except for Edmundston, Shediac and Dieppe which runs as IGA-Co-op, previously acquired by Sobeys New Brunswick) and were restructured under its existing brands. The company-owned stores west of Quebec now mainly operate under the Sobeys banner. In Ontario, IGA stores have been converted to the Foodland banner. There are, however, many IGA stores still operating in Manitoba, Saskatchewan and Alberta, with one opening in Emerald Park, Saskatchewan in 2016.

IGA Extra locations are larger and carry a wider variety of general merchandise, more akin to the hypermarket model. They include a pharmacy, large bakery, a bank, a bistro, a post office, and a larger selection of food items. IGA Extra launched in the early 2000s to take the place of Sobeys locations in the Quebec City and Montreal areas. In 2015, several Co-op Atlantic stores became IGA stores supplied by Sobeys Quebec after Co-Op decided to exit the grocery store business.

In Quebec, IGA also operates smaller supermarkets. These include Bonichoix and Tradition (a brand introduced in 1999).

In British Columbia, IGA stores (previously Marketplace IGA) are, for the most part, independently owned and are operated by Georgia Main Food Group.

Australia

The IGA brand in Australia is owned by Metcash, an Australian conglomerate retailer and wholesaler. The company supplies groceries, promotional materials, and other things to a large number of locally owned Australian supermarkets, and a few other brands like Foodland and Friendly Grocer. Collectively, they are the fourth biggest competitor in major Australian supermarkets, after Coles, Woolworths and Aldi. There are 1,400 independently owned IGA stores throughout Australia, with most running their own IGA Community Chest, which raises funds to support local communities and charities.

Philippines
Walter Mart Supermarket is the first and only alliance member in the Philippines with 21 locations, mostly in Metro Manila and Luzon - from Gapan, Nueva Ecija in the north to Tanauan, Batangas in the south.

Gallery

See also

 List of supermarket chains
 List of supermarket chains in Canada
 List of supermarket chains in Oceania
 List of supermarket chains in the United States

References

External links
 IGA USA
 IGA Mid-Eastern USA
 IGA Quebec
 IGA Western Canada
 IGA British Columbia
 IGA Australia
 Burlington Retro Meet the town's first supermarket

Companies based in Chicago
Multinational companies
American companies established in 1926
Retail companies established in 1926
Retailers' cooperatives in the United States
Supermarkets of Canada
Supermarkets of the United States
Sobeys
Supermarkets of Australia